Grand Baie (or sometimes Grand Bay) is a coastal village in Mauritius located in the Rivière du Rempart District, but the western part also lies inside the Pamplemousses District. The village is administered by the Grand Baie Village Council under the aegis of the Rivière du Rempart District Council. According to the census performed by Statistics Mauritius in 2011, the population was at 11,910.

Gallery

See also 
 Districts of Mauritius
 List of places in Mauritius

References 

Beaches of Mauritius
Populated places in Mauritius
Rivière du Rempart District